

The Stafford GP is a criterium cycle race held in the town of Stafford owned and organised by Leadout Cycling Ltd under the technical regulations of British Cycling. Since 2010 it has been part of British Cycling’s Elite Circuit Race Series.

History 

The origins of today’s Stafford GP go back to the Stafford Town Centre Races held in the 1980s. Like today, criteriums were an important part of professional cycling. Whilst not part of the televised Kelloggs, the races attracted a star-studded field and huge crowds. Five editions were held during the 1980s.

The first edition of the race was won by Roger Willett from Finchfield, who later rode for the Great Britain senior team.

The undisputed king of the Stafford Town Centre Races was Steve Joughin.  As a local rider who settled in Stoke-on-Trent at the start of his professional career and riding for local sponsors Moducel. Joughin was undefeated in the 3 editions of the race in which he competed.

The last Stafford Town Centre race took place in 1987 and was won by Mark Walsham.

Today 

A criterium race was revived in Stafford in 2010 by Leadout Cycling Ltd. The Stafford GP has been part of the British Cycling Elite Circuit Race Series, a series of races held usually in mid week across towns in England. Since its reincarnation there have been 8 editions of the race. The 2010 race was won by Olympic champion Ed Clancy. The 2011 edition was won by Australian Dean Windsor. The 2012 saw Graham Briggs take the victory - one of his 5 victories on the way to the 2012 Elite Circuit Race Series title. In 2013 the race became part of the Staffordshire Cycling Festival. The last time the race took place in Stafford was 2018.

2018 

 Rory Townsend Canyon Eisberg
 Charles Page Canyon Eisberg
 Andrew Tennant Canyon Eisberg

2017 
Not held

2016 

 Albert Torres (Raleigh GAC)
 Felix English (Madison Genesis)
 Sebastian Mora Vedri (Raleigh GAC)

2015 

 Jonathan Mould One Pro Cycling
 Adam Blythe Orica Greenedge
 Morgan Kneisky Raleigh GAC

2014 

 Luke Grivell-Mellor (GBR) Rapha Condor JLT 00:53:57
 Edward Clancy MBE (GBR) Rapha Condor JLT 00:00:01
 Chris Opie Rapha (GBR) Condor JLT 00:00:17

2013 

 Tom Scully (NZL) Team Raleigh
 Graham Briggs (GBR) Team Raleigh
 George Atkins (GBR) 100%ME

2012 
 Graham Briggs (GBR) Team Raleigh-GAC
 Rico Rogers (NZL) Node4-Giordana
 Matt Cronshaw (GBR) Node4-Giordana

2011 
 Dean Windsor (AUS) Rapha Condor - Sharp
 Dean Downing (GBR) Rapha Condor - Sharp
 Simon Gaywood (GBR) Corley Cycles

2010 
 Ed Clancy (GBR) Motorpoint
 Ian Wilkinson (GBR) Endura
 Dean Downing (GBR) Rapha Condor - Sharp

External links
Stafford GP Home Page
 British Cycling Elite Circuit Series

References 

Cycle racing in the United Kingdom
Cycle races in England
Men's road bicycle races
Recurring sporting events established in 1982
1982 establishments in England